The Pendleton Fault, sometimes called the Irwell Valley Fault, stretches for about  from Bolton in Greater Manchester along the Irwell Valley through Pendleton to Poynton in Cheshire, running northwest–southeast. The fault is active, and movement has caused earthquakes. Lesser shocks were recorded in the early 20th century, in 1931 and 1944. Coal mining in the Irwell Valley between Bolton and Pendleton may account for small movements, although all mines in the area closed in 1929 and no coal has been mined since.

In 2007 a swarm of six earthquakes felt across the region was attributed to the fault.

References

Notes

Bibliography

Geology of England
Geology of Cheshire
Seismic faults of the United Kingdom